Bronco Joseph Horvath (March 12, 1930 – December 17, 2019) was a Canadian professional ice hockey player who played 434 games in the National Hockey League (NHL) between 1955 and 1968.

Early life
Horvath was born to an ethnic Hungarian family that emigrated from Transcarpathia after the end of World War I, when it became part of Czechoslovakia.

Career
Horvath was signed by the Detroit Red Wings as an amateur. On August 18, 1955, the Red Wings traded Horvath and Dave Creighton to the New York Rangers in exchange for Aggie Kukulowicz and Billy Dea.

Horvath is perhaps best remembered for his time playing on the famous "Uke Line" with the Boston Bruins, with fellow Ukrainian-Canadians Johnny Bucyk and Vic Stasiuk. Horvath missed out on the Art Ross Trophy in 1959–60 by a single point to Bobby Hull, however he tied with Hull for the goal-scoring lead, with 39. He played for five of the Original Six teams in the NHL (only missing Detroit), He did apprentice with the Edmonton Flyers, Detroit's WHL farm team, along with John Bucyk & Vic Stasiuk, his future Uke Linemates. He was demoted to the minors in 1963.

He played most of the next six seasons with the Rochester Americans of the American Hockey League (AHL). He was on three AHL Calder Cup championships for Rochester in 1964–65, 1965–66 and 1967–68. and was among the league's scoring leaders for several seasons.

With the increased demand for players with the NHL expansion in 1967, Horvath found himself back in the league with the Minnesota North Stars. At mid-season of that year he returned to the Rochester Americans and helped lead them to the championship. He would finish his career with Rochester and ultimately retired from playing in 1970. Horvath is a charter member of the Rochester Americans Hall of Fame.

The following year, he became coach of the London Knights of the OHL, from 1971–72. He moved to South Yarmouth, Massachusetts, when he was named coach of the Cape Cod Cubs, an expansion team in the Eastern Hockey League, in 1972. He coached the Cubs to a regular-season divisional championship and a sweep of their first-round playoff series with the Long Island Ducks before a powerful Syracuse Blazers team ended Cape Cod's league championship hopes. Horvath returned as coach for the 1973–74 season with the Cubs, who were charter members of the new North American Hockey League, but was fired after the team got off to a slow start. His last coaching job was a brief stint at Dennis-Yarmouth Regional High School. He resided on Cape Cod, where he enjoyed an occasional round of golf.

Horvath was inducted in the AHL Hall of Fame in 2015. He died on December 17, 2019 in Hyannis, Massachusetts.

Career statistics

Regular season and playoffs

References

External links

Boston Bruins players
Chicago Blackhawks players
Edmonton Flyers (WHL) players
Galt Black Hawks players
Canadian people of Hungarian descent
London Knights coaches
Minnesota North Stars players
Montreal Canadiens players
New York Rangers players
North American Hockey League (1973–1977) coaches
Rochester Americans players
Stanley Cup champions
Syracuse Warriors players
Toronto Maple Leafs players
People from Port Colborne
Canadian people of Ukrainian descent
1930 births
2019 deaths
Canadian ice hockey centres
Canadian ice hockey coaches